Stephanie Turner may refer to:

 Stephanie Turner (British actress)
 Stephanie Turner (American actress)